Mutarazi Falls is a waterfall in Mutasa District in Manicaland Province, Zimbabwe. it is located in the 2,495 hectare Mutarazi National Park adjacent to the southern border of the Nyanga National Park. At , it is the highest in Zimbabwe, second highest in Africa and 17th highest in the world.

Description 
The water falls into Honde Valley in two tiers, at a point where the Mtarazi river flows over the edge of the eastern escarpment of Zimbabwe's highlands.

See also
List of waterfalls by height

References

External links

 Mutarazi Falls

Eastern Highlands
Geography of Manicaland Province
Mutasa District
Waterfalls of Zimbabwe